Pippi Longstocking is a 1997 animated musical adventure comedy film co-directed by Michael Schaack and Clive A. Smith, and written by Catharina Stackelberg, based on the eponymous children's books by Astrid Lindgren. A joint Swedish-German-Canadian venture produced by Svensk Filmindustri, IdunaFilm, TFC Trickompany and Nelvana, the film features the voices of Melissa Altro, Catherine O'Hara, Gordon Pinsent, Dave Thomas, Wayne Robson and Carole Pope.

For its releases in both the United States and Canada, the film was distributed theatrically by Legacy Releasing, and on VHS and DVD by Warner Home Video under their Warner Bros. Family Entertainment label. It was also served as a pilot of a spin-off television series, which premiered on Teletoon in Canada, and then aired on HBO. From there, only three out of thirteen episodes from the series' first season, Pippi Goes to the South Seas, Pippi Meets Some Pearl Poachers and Pippi Goes Home were combined into a feature film Pippi's Adventures on the South Seas, released on VHS and DVD by HBO Home Video on 2 May 2000.

The film is Nelvana's first animated theatrical feature since Babar: The Movie.

Plot
The film begins with Pippi sailing around the world with her father, Captain Efraim Longstocking, her pet horse, Horace, her pet monkey, Mr. Nilsson, and various members of the ship's crew. One night during a hurricane, the captain is washed over board into the sea. As he drifts off, he calls to Pippi that he will "meet her in Villa Villekulla". To that effect, Pippi and her pet animals make their way home, Villa Villekulla, to await his return. Not long after arriving, she makes friends with the two children across the street — Tommy and Annika, who are captivated by her free spirit and fun-loving attitude. They soon convince her to go to school (for the first time in her life) where she gets into trouble, despite winning the hearts of her classmates.

Pippi also soon attracts the attention of a local social worker, Mrs. Prysselius, who conspires to put her into foster care. When Mrs. Prysselius goes to speak with the local law enforcement of the need for the girl to be placed in a home for orphans, she lets certain details (her lack of adult supervision, living alone, having a large supply of gold coins kept out in the open, and most of all, leaving her door unlocked) be revealed to a pair of thieves already in jail. The thieves, Bloom and Thunder-Karlsson, decide to rob Pippi themselves once they break out of jail.

Pippi and her friends take part in many adventures and close-calls, winning over almost everyone, with the exception of Mrs. Prysselius and Tommy and Annika's parents. Just when Mrs. Prysselius has had enough, gets into a breakdown and is about to drag Pippi straight to the children's home herself, Pippi's father returns to take her back to their life on the sea. However, Pippi decides that she can't leave her new friends and decides to stay in Villa Villekulla.

Cast
 Melissa Altro as Pippilotta Delicatessa Windowshade Mackrelmint Efraim's Daughter "Pippi" Longstocking
 Catherine O'Hara as Mrs. Helga Prysselius
 Gordon Pinsent as Captain Efraim Longstocking
 Dave Thomas as Thunder-Karlsson
 Wayne Robson as Bloom
 Carole Pope as Teacher
 Noah Reid as Tommy Settegren
 Olivia Garratt as Annika Settegren
 Judy Tate provides Annika's singing voice.
 Rick Jones as Constable Kling / O'Malley
 Philip Williams as Constable Klang / Ringmaster
 Mari Trainor as Mrs. Kling
 Elva Mai Hoover as Mrs. Klang
 Richard Binsley as Mr. Nilsson / Mrs. Prysselius' Dog
 Karen Bernstein as Mrs. Ingrid Settergren
 Martin Lavut as Mr. Settergren

Musical numbers
 "What Shall I Do Today?" - Pippi
 "Hey-Ho, I'm Pippi" - Pippi
 "Recipe for Life" - Pippi, Tommy and Annika
 "A Bowler and a New Gold Tooth" - Bloom and Thunder-Karlsson
 "A Bowler and a New Gold Tooth" (reprise) - Bloom and Thunder-Karlsson
 "Pluttifikation" - Teacher, Pippi and Students
 "The Schottische" - Bloom, Pippi and Thunder-Karlsson
 "What Shall I Do Today?" (reprise) - Pippi
 "Hey-Ho, I'm Pippi" (reprise) - Pippi
 "Recipe for Life" (reprise) - Pippi

Release

Box office
Pippi Longstocking opened theatrically in the United States on 22 August 1997 in 73 venues. In its opening weekend, the film earned $62,196, ranking number 23 in the box office. The film closed on 30 October 1997, having grossed $505,335.

Critical reception
The film received mixed reviews from critics. Review aggregator website Rotten Tomatoes reports a 43% rating based on 7 reviews, with an average rating of 4.4/10. Lawrence Van Gelder of The New York Times gave the film a mixed review, stating "As Goldilocks might say, when it comes to uncomplicated children's entertainment, this Pippi Longstocking is not too big, not too small, but just right." Howard Feinstein of Variety largely disapproved of Melissa Altro's acting, but praised the performances for "Pluttifikation" and "A Bowler and a New Gold Tooth".

References

External links
 
 
 
 
 Review at bfi.org.uk (with cast and crew credits)

1997 films
1997 animated films
1997 independent films
1997 fantasy films
1990s musical comedy films
English-language Canadian films
English-language German films
Swedish animated fantasy films
Swedish musical films
Swedish independent films
German animated fantasy films
German children's films
German independent films
German musical comedy films
Canadian animated feature films
Canadian musical films
Canadian independent films
Canadian animated fantasy films
Animated musical films
1990s children's comedy films
1990s children's fantasy films
Animated films based on children's books
Films adapted into television shows
Films based on Pippi Longstocking
Nelvana films
1997 comedy films
1990s children's animated films
1990s English-language films
Films directed by Michael Schaack
1990s Canadian films
1990s German films
1990s Swedish films